South Texarkana is an unincorporated community in Bowie County, in the U.S. state of Texas. According to the Handbook of Texas, the community had a population of 370 in 2000. It is located within the Texarkana metropolitan area.

History
The area grew up sometime after 1900 and was incorporated in the middle of the decade. Its population was 316 in 1952 and grew to 370 from 1992 through 2000.

Geography
South Texarkana is located off of Farm to Market Road 558, just south of Texarkana in eastern Bowie County.

Education
South Texarkana is served by the Texarkana Independent School District.

References

Unincorporated communities in Bowie County, Texas
Unincorporated communities in Texas